Ciceribacter is a bacterial genus of the family Rhizobiaceae.

Phylogeny
The currently accepted taxonomy is based on the List of Prokaryotic names with Standing in Nomenclature (LPSN). The phylogeny is based on whole-genome analysis.

References

Rhizobiaceae
Bacteria genera